Yunnanxane is a bioactive taxane diterpenoid first isolated from Taxus wallichiana. Yunnanxane was later isolated from  cell cultures of Taxus cuspidata and Taxus chinensis. Four homologous esters of yunnanxane have also been isolated from Taxus. Yunnanxane is reported to have anticancer activity in vitro.

See also
 Taxusin
 Hongdoushans

References

Acetate esters
Taxanes
Vinylidene compounds